Shur Kahriz (also Romanized as Shūr Kahrīz) is a village in Hajjilar-e Shomali Rural District, Hajjilar District, Chaypareh County, West Azerbaijan Province, Iran. At the 2006 census, its population was 28, in 6 families.

References 

Populated places in Chaypareh County